The Odessa File is an 1974 thriller film, adapted from the 1972 novel of the same name by Frederick Forsyth, about a reporter's investigation of a neo-Nazi political-industrial network in post-Second World War West Germany. The film stars Jon Voight, Mary Tamm, Maximilian Schell and Maria Schell and was directed by Ronald Neame, with a score by Andrew Lloyd Webber. It was the only film that the Schell siblings made together.

Plot 
On 22 November 1963, the day of the John F. Kennedy assassination in Dallas, Peter Miller (Jon Voight), a young freelance reporter in Hamburg, West Germany, pulls his car over to the kerb to listen to a radio report of the event. As a result, he happens to be stopped at a traffic signal as an ambulance passes by on a highway.

He follows the ambulance and discovers it is en route to pick up the body of an elderly man who has committed suicide, leaving behind no family. Peter obtains the man's diary and learns the man was Salomon Tauber (Towje Kleiner), a Jewish Holocaust survivor. Salomon's diary details information on his life in the Riga Ghetto during World War II, including the name of the SS officer who ran the camp, Eduard Roschmann (Maximilian Schell). Salomon's diary catalogues all of Roschmann's crimes including the murder of a highly decorated Wehrmacht officer (Oskar Werner) while attempting to flee at the end of the war.

Peter is filled with a determination to hunt Roschmann down and he sets out to meet famed Nazi-hunter Simon Wiesenthal, who informs him about ODESSA, a secret organization for former members of the SS which is developing a missile guidance system for Nasserist Egypt. Wiesenthal explains that most of the West Berlin Police are members of ODESSA and not to be trusted. As Peter leaves he is accosted by Israeli Mossad agents who suspect Peter of trying to harm Wiesenthal. Peter manages to convince the men that his true mission is to find and bring Roschmann to justice. The Israelis propose to send Peter deep undercover in the ODESSA. Peter agrees to the mission and with the help of the Israelis, they provide him with a cover identity. Peter is to be a former SS soldier who died recently in a nearby hospital. Before going under cover, Peter then leaves his girlfriend Sigi (Mary Tamm).

The Israelis drill Peter on all details of his cover identity in preparation of meeting with ODESSA. Complete with a new cover identity, Peter gains access to the inner ranks of the ODESSA. After getting through his first test he is sent to get a fake passport from a forger who is working for ODESSA. While awaiting his train, Peter blunders by making a call to Sigi to assure her that he is OK. Thinking he is safe, he boards the train. Meanwhile, the ODESSA report back that Peter has made a call and they work out that Peter is not who he says he is. An assassin is dispatched to kill him. Peter meets with the forger Klaus Wenzer (Derek Jacobi) a shy insecure young man living with his mother. After taking passport photos, Klaus tells Peter to return after the weekend, but then calls him after midnight and tells him to return within the hour.

Suspicious, Peter rings Klaus' home from his hotel and having had no answer is wary, and sees the armed assassin who is waiting for him. Peter sneaks into the house and awakes Klaus' mother: she mistakes him for a priest and begs him to pray for her son. He then tackles the assassin and manages to kill the man. Whilst exploring Klaus' safe he uncovers a book detailing every fake ID Klaus created and detail the real identity of those he created the fake IDs for. Peter takes the file and hides it in a train station locker, later giving the key to Sigi, lest anything should happen to him.

Peter victorious returns to the Israelis and details all he has found but refuses to disclose the location of the file until Roschmann has been apprehended. The Israeli agents reluctantly agree to Peter's demands and he then leaves for Roschmann's home where he finds him living an opulent life as a munitions factory owner. Peter manages to gain access to the mansion and evade his security before confronting Roschmann at gunpoint. Peter reveals Salomon Tauber's diary to Roschmann who attempts to deny everything, claiming Peter has been misled. Peter then discloses to Roschmann, Salomon's description of the murder of a fellow German Wehrmacht officer at the end of the war. Peter goes through the unique details of the cowardly murder and then discloses that the Wehrmacht officer was in fact Peter's father. Roschmann realising he is about to be exposed, panics and goes for his gun forcing Peter to defend himself. Peter returns fire at Roschmann killing the former SS officer.

The detailed ODESSA files obtained by Peter are used to arrest numerous Nazi war criminals including high-ranking members of the police. Later Roschmann's factory mysteriously burns to the ground before any rockets are delivered to Egypt.

Cast 

 Jon Voight as Peter Miller
 Mary Tamm as Sigi
 Maximilian Schell as Eduard Roschmann
 Maria Schell as Frau Miller
 Derek Jacobi as Klaus Wenzer
 Peter Jeffrey as David Porath
 Klaus Löwitsch as Gustav Mackensen
 Kurt Meisel as Alfred Oster
 Hannes Messemer as General Glücks
 Garfield Morgan as Israeli General
 Shmuel Rodensky as Simon Wiesenthal
 Ernst Schröder as Werner Deilman
 Günter Strack as Kunik
 Noel Willman as Franz Bayer
 Günter Meisner as General Greifer
 Gunnar Möller as Karl Braun
 Til Kiwe as Medal Shop Proprietor
 Cyril Shaps as Tauber's Voice (narrating the diary)
 Oskar Werner as an Wehrmacht Officer (uncredited)

Production
Filming was done on location in Hamburg, Germany; Salzburg, Austria; Heidelberg, Germany; Munich, Germany; at Pinewood Studios, England; and the Bavaria Studios in Grünwald, Bavaria, Germany. It was filmed with Panavision equipment, produced with Eastmancolor technologies.

The film's title song, "Christmas Dream", written by Andrew Lloyd Webber and Tim Rice, was sung by Perry Como and the London Boy Singers.

Simon Wiesenthal served as a technical advisor for the production.

Reception
The film premiered at the 1974 San Francisco International Film Festival. The American Nazi Party staged a protest outside the theater but it was mistaken for a promotion of the film.

Nora Sayre of the New York Times said, "The film makes its points methodically, almost academically. It also drags because there are many unnecessary transitional passages, devoted to moving the characters from one situation to another. Almost every occurrence is predictable."

References

External links 
 
 
 
 
 
 

1974 films
1974 independent films
1970s English-language films
1970s spy thriller films
British independent films
British political thriller films
British thriller drama films
British spy thriller films
Columbia Pictures films
English-language German films
Films about journalists
Films about Nazi hunters
Films about the Mossad
Films based on British novels
Films based on thriller novels
Films based on works by Frederick Forsyth
Films directed by Ronald Neame
Films set in 1963
Films set in 1964
Films set in Hamburg
Films set in Munich
Films set in Salzburg
Films set in Vienna
Films shot in Austria
Films shot in England
Films shot in Germany
Films shot in Hamburg
Films shot at Pinewood Studios
Films shot at Bavaria Studios
Films about the aftermath of the Holocaust
West German films
1970s political thriller films
Films about Nazis
Films about Nazism
Films about Nazi fugitives
Films set in Jerusalem
Films set in Heidelberg
Films about the Arab–Israeli conflict
Films set in Riga
Films set in 1944
1970s British films

ja:オデッサ・ファイル#映画